Rihards Marenis (born 18 April 1993) is a Latvian professional ice hockey player currently playing with Modo Hockey in the Hockeyallsvenskan and the Latvian national team. He formerly played with Dinamo Riga in the Kontinental Hockey League (KHL)

He represented Latvia at the 2019 IIHF World Championship.

References

External links

1993 births
Living people
Aurora University alumni
Dinamo Riga players
Latvian expatriate ice hockey people
Latvian expatriate sportspeople in Canada
Latvian expatriate sportspeople in the United States
Latvian ice hockey forwards
Modo Hockey players
Ice hockey people from Riga
HC Vita Hästen players
Örebro HK players